Neurology India is a bimonthly peer-reviewed open-access medical journal published by Medknow Publications on behalf of the Neurological Society of India. It covers all aspects of neurology, including neurosurgery, neuropsychiatry, neuropathology, neuro-oncology, and neuro-pharmaceutics.

Abstracting and indexing 
The journal is abstracted and indexed in:

According to the Journal Citation Reports, the journal has a 2019 impact factor of 2.708.

References

External links 
 
 Secondary Website

Open access journals
Bimonthly journals
English-language journals
Neurology journals
Medknow Publications academic journals
Publications established in 1953
Academic journals associated with learned and professional societies of India